Abisara rutherfordii, the scalloped Judy, is a butterfly in the family Riodinidae. It is found in Nigeria, Cameroon, Gabon, the Republic of the Congo, the Democratic Republic of the Congo, Uganda, Rwanda and Tanzania. The habitat consists of primary forests.

Subspecies
Abisara rutherfordii rutherfordii (Nigeria: south and the Cross River loop, western Cameroon)
Abisara rutherfordii cyclops Riley, 1932 (Uganda, Rwanda, Tanzania, Democratic Republic of the Congo: Uele, Ituri, Tshopo, Sankuru and Lualaba)
Abisara rutherfordii herwigii Dewitz, 1887 (eastern Cameroon, Gabon, Congo)

References

Butterflies described in 1874
Abisara
Butterflies of Africa
Taxa named by William Chapman Hewitson